The 2013 English cricket season was the 114th in which the County Championship had been an official competition. It began on 5 April with a round of university matches, and continued until the conclusion of a round of County Championship matches on 27 September. Three major domestic competitions were contested: the 2013 County Championship, the 2013 Clydesdale Bank 40 and the 2013 Friends Life t20.

Australia toured England to compete for the Ashes. It was the 76th test series between the two sides with England winning 3-0. The New Zealand cricket team toured earlier in the summer.

Roll of honour
Test series
 England v New Zealand: 2 Tests - England won 2–0.
 England v Australia: 5 Tests - England won 3–0.

ODI series
 England v New Zealand: 3 ODIs - New Zealand won 2–1.
 England v Australia: 5 ODIs - Australia won 2–1.

Twenty20 International series
 England v New Zealand: 2 T20Is - New Zealand won 1–0.
 England v Australia: 2 T20Is - Series drawn 1-1.

ICC Champions Trophy
Champions Trophy: Winners - India

County Championship
 Division One winners: Durham
 Division One runners-up: Yorkshire
 Division Two winners: Lancashire

Yorkshire Bank 40
 Winners: Nottinghamshire Outlaws 
 Runners-up: Glamorgan Dragons

Friends Life t20
 Winners: Northamptonshire Steelbacks
 Runners-up: Surrey

Minor Counties Championship 
 Winners: Cheshire
 Runners-up: Cambridgeshire

MCCA Knockout Trophy
 Winners: Berkshire
 Runners-up: Shropshire

Second XI Championship
 Winners: Lancashire II and Middlesex II (shared title)

Second XI Trophy
 Winners: Lancashire II

Second XI Twenty20
 Winners: Surrey II

Wisden Cricketers of the Year
 Nick Compton, Hashim Amla, Jacques Kallis, Dale Steyn, Marlon Samuels

PCA Player of the Year
 Moeen Ali

County Championship

Divisions

Division One Standings
 Pld = Played, W = Wins, L = Losses, D = Draws, T = Ties, A = Abandonments, Bat = Batting points, Bowl = Bowling points, Ded = Deducted points, Pts = Points.

Division Two Standings
 Pld = Played, W = Wins, L = Losses, D = Draws, T = Ties, A = Abandonments, Bat = Batting points, Bowl = Bowling points, Ded = Deducted points, Pts = Points.

Yorkshire Bank 40

Group stage

Group A

Group B

Group C

Knockout stage

Friends Life t20

Group stage
Midlands/Wales/West Division

North Group

South Group

Knockout stage

Test Series

Ashes tour

England vs New Zealand

References

 2013

Cricket season